Batabari Tea Garden is a village and a gram panchayat in the Matiali CD block in the Malbazar subdivision of the Jalpaiguri district  in the state of West Bengal, India.

Etymology
The houses are made of a bamboo species known as ‘bata’. Hence the name Batabari.

Geography

Location                                        
Chalsa Junction railway station is located nearby.

Area overview
Gorumara National Park has overtaken traditionally popular Jaldapara National Park in footfall and Malbazar has emerged as one of the most important towns in the Dooars. Malbazar subdivision is presented in the map alongside. It is a predominantly rural area with 88.62% of the population living in rural areas and 11.32% living in the urban areas. Tea gardens in the Dooars and Terai regions produce 226 million kg or over a quarter of India's total tea crop.  Some tea gardens were identified in the 2011 census as census towns or villages. Such places are marked in the map as CT (census town) or R (rural/ urban centre). Specific tea estate pages are marked TE.

Note: The map alongside presents some of the notable locations in the subdivision. All places marked in the map are linked in the larger full screen map.

Demographics
As per the 2011 Census of India, Batabari Tea Garden had a total population of 2,644.  There were 1,277 (48%) males and 1,367 (52%) females. There were 325 persons in the age range of 0 to 6 years. The total number of literate people in Batabari Tea Garden was 1,415 (68.61.02% of the population over 6 years).

Tourism
The main attraction of the place is the landscape and the tea garden. Batabari has a number of resorts for comfortable stay. While staying at Batabari one can visit Gorumara National Park, Jaldapara National Park and Chapramari Wildlife Sanctuary. Other attractions in the area are: Dam Dim, Chalsa, India, Malbazar, Samsing and Phuntsholing (in Bhutan).

References

Villages in Jalpaiguri district